Daniel Alejandro Castro Cruz (born November 14, 1992) is a Mexican professional baseball infielder for the Sultanes de Monterrey of the Mexican League. He previously played in Major League Baseball (MLB) for the Atlanta Braves and Colorado Rockies.

Career

Atlanta Braves
Castro signed with the Atlanta Braves in 2009 as a free agent. They allowed him to play for the Saraperos de Saltillo of the Mexican League to gain experience in 2012 and 2013. In August 2013, the Braves assigned Castro to the Lynchburg Hillcats of the Class A-Advanced Carolina League.

After Castro began the 2015 season with the Gwinnett Braves of the Class AAA International League, the Braves promoted him to the major leagues for the first time on June 17, 2015. He recorded his first Major league hit against the Boston Red Sox while pinch-hitting for relief pitcher Nick Masset. He was optioned to Gwinnett the next day. The Braves recalled Castro on July 25, after the Braves traded Juan Uribe and Kelly Johnson. Castro was optioned back to Gwinnett on August 8, along with Todd Cunningham, after the Braves acquired Nick Swisher and Michael Bourn from the Cleveland Indians.

Castro was recalled to the major leagues on April 13, 2016, after beginning the season at Gwinnett. He filled in at second base, third base, and shortstop when needed, and hit .182 in 42 games. After starting shortstop Erick Aybar was reactivated on June 12, Castro was optioned to the minors. He elected free agency after the season.

Colorado Rockies
During the 2016 offseason, Castro signed a minor league contract with the Colorado Rockies. He elected free agency on November 6, 2017. On January 30, 2018, Castro resigned a minor league deal with the Colorado Rockies. He was called up to the major leagues on May 1, 2018. Castro was designated for assignment on July 21, 2018. He elected free agency on October 12, 2018.

Los Angeles Dodgers
On November 12, 2018, Castro signed a minor league deal with the Los Angeles Dodgers. He was assigned to AAA Oklahoma City Dodgers to start the 2019 season.

Seattle Mariners
On July 28, 2019, Castro was traded to the Seattle Mariners in exchange for Kristopher Negrón.
 He became a free agent following the 2019 season.

Toros de Tijuana
On February 24, 2020, Castro signed with the Toros de Tijuana of the Mexican League. Castro did not play in a game in 2020 due to the cancellation of the Mexican League season because of the COVID-19 pandemic.

Sultanes de Monterrey
On September 27, 2021, Castro, along with P Jake Sanchez and C Victor Ortega, were traded to the Sultanes de Monterrey of the Mexican League.

References

External links

1992 births
Living people
Águilas de Mexicali players
Albuquerque Isotopes players
Atlanta Braves players
Baseball players from Sonora
Colorado Rockies players
Dominican Summer League Braves players
Mexican expatriate baseball players in the Dominican Republic
Gwinnett Braves players
Lynchburg Hillcats players
Mayos de Navojoa players
Major League Baseball second basemen
Major League Baseball shortstops
Major League Baseball third basemen
Mexican expatriate baseball players in the United States
Mexican League baseball left fielders
Mexican League baseball right fielders
Mexican League baseball second basemen
Mexican League baseball shortstops
Mexican League baseball third basemen
Mississippi Braves players
People from Guaymas
Peoria Javelinas players
Saraperos de Saltillo players
Yaquis de Obregón players
Oklahoma City Dodgers players
Arizona League Dodgers players
Tacoma Rainiers players
Toros de Tijuana players